Serijan (also Romanized as Serījān and Sīrjān; also known as Sar-i-Jub) is a village in Qohestan Rural District, Qohestan District, Darmian County, South Khorasan Province, Iran. At the 2006 census, its population was 138, in 34 families.

References 

Populated places in Darmian County